"Gaslighter" is a song recorded by American country music group Dixie Chicks from their eighth studio album of the same name. The song was written and produced by the group and Jack Antonoff. "Gaslighter" was the final release by the group before changing their name to "The Chicks" in June 2020.

Composition
The title of the song refers to gaslighting. The song has been described as an "empowering", "fiery", and "scathing" anthem.

Critical reception
Pitchfork awarded "Gaslighter" their "Best New Track" distinction, with Sam Sodomsky writing that it "merges the open-road optimism of their early records with the sharper power-pop" of their previous album many years earlier, Taking the Long Way.

Music video
The song's music video was directed by Seanne Farmer, and has been described as "a throwback to old school political propaganda".

Charts

Weekly charts

Year-end charts

References

2020 singles
2020 songs
The Chicks songs
American power pop songs
Song recordings produced by Jack Antonoff
Songs written by Emily Robison
Songs written by Jack Antonoff
Songs written by Martie Maguire
Songs written by Natalie Maines